Mexcaltitán de Uribe, also known simply as Mexcaltitán, is a small man-made island-city in the municipality of Santiago Ixcuintla in the Mexican state of Nayarit. Its name derives from two Náhuatl words, "mexcalli" and "titlán". Some historians have raised the possibility that it was the Aztlan of the Aztecs, their home city and birthplace from where they set out on their pilgrimage in 1091 that led them to the founding of Tenochtitlan.

This island is now being promoted as a tourist attraction. It was designated a "Pueblo Mágico" by the federal government in 2001, and, after losing the status for several years, was reinstated in the program in 2020. It is accessible by boat from La Batanga, which is the dock area located some 40 kilometers from Santiago Ixcuintla. It is known as "The Mexican Venice" (La Venecia Mexicana).

The principal tourist attraction of the island consists of its colorful houses with traditional water resistant roofs. During the rainy season it is necessary to travel by boat due to flooding in the streets.

Geographic location 
The island is approximately 1100' (335m) in diameter, nearly round in shape.

Currently it is a nationally recognized tourist center, located 22.3 mi (36 km) from the city of Santiago Ixcuintla, and 60 mi (98 km) from the city of Tepic.

History 
During the 1960s, Mexican intellectuals began to seriously speculate about the possibility that Mexcaltitán was the mythical city of Aztlán, from where the Mexicas (later known as the Aztecs) left to initiate their pilgrimage. One of the first to consider Aztlán being linked to the Nayaritian island was historian Alfredo Chavero towards the end of the 19th century. Historical investigators after his death tested his proposition and considered it valid, among them Wigberto Jiménez Moreno. This hypothesis is still up for debate.

In July 2009 the title of Pueblo Mágico was taken from the island city by the Mexican Secretary of Tourism, because it didn't comply with the observations made by the Comité Técnico during the National Meeting of Pueblos Mágicos which took place in February of the same year in Tapalpa, Jalisco. The designation was officially restored to Mexcaltitán in December of 2020.

Demographics 
In the 2010 INEGI census, the island had 818 inhabitants.

Infrastructure 
Among other landmarks, the city boasts a museum, a Catholic church, the ejido commission, an elementary school and a government operated hospital.

The island is served by 2 ferries: La Batanga, the most transited, 3.7 mi (6 km) away from Mexcaltitán and El Matadero, smaller than the other, 1.2 mi (2 km) away from the island.

The ejido (public farmland allotted to citizens) of Mexcaltitán consists of an extensive area of land and water, and is considered considerably superior to other nearby ejidos in the same district consisting of the cities of El Mezcal, Aztlán de las Garzas, San Miguel Nº 2, El Nuevo Mexcaltitán and San Vicente.

References 

Islands of Nayarit

External links 
 Mexcaltitan: Home of the Aztec people.
 Mexcaltitan, Nayarit: an island city in the swamp.
 Collection of images of Mexcaltitán.